Fabian Stanach is a Polish chess player. He won the 31st World Correspondence Chess Championship in 2022.

References 

Year of birth missing (living people)
Living people
Polish chess players
World Correspondence Chess Champions
Place of birth missing (living people)
Correspondence chess grandmasters
21st-century Polish people